Chemical Wedding (released in the U.S. as Crowley) is a British science-fantasy horror film produced by Bill and Ben Productions in conjunction with the London-based Focus Films. It is directed by Julian Doyle. The story is based on an original screenplay by Bruce Dickinson, front man of heavy metal band Iron Maiden. Dickinson released a solo album entitled The Chemical Wedding in 1998, which, despite sharing the title and title track from the film's soundtrack, is otherwise unrelated.

Plot
Upon entering a virtual reality machine, Professor Oliver Haddo, a modern Cambridge scholar, becomes possessed by the spirit of  infamous occultist Aleister Crowley, as the machine's program has been corrupted by a former follower of Crowley's. Resurrected 50 years after his death, Crowley begins his occult practices anew, seeking a new "scarlet bride" whom he can marry in an occult ceremony, which will increase his power.

Cast
Simon Callow as Professor Oliver Haddo/Aleister Crowley
Kal Weber as Dr. Joshua Mathers
Lucy Cudden as Lia Robinson
Jud Charlton as Victor Nuberg
Paul McDowell as Symonds
John Shrapnel as Aleister Crowley (original)
Terence Bayler as Professor Brent
Mike Shannon as Alex
Bruce Dickinson as Crowley's landlord and as a blind man
Richard Franklin as Dean of Trinity University

Production
The film was originally proposed in 2000 and was to have been produced by Terry Jones' Messiah Films, but was later adopted by Focus Films. David Pupkewitz and Malcolm Kohll produced the film, with Ben Timlett and Justin Peyton of Bill and Ben Productions and Duellist Film Production in association with MotionFX and E-Motion. Executive producers are Andy Taylor, Paul Astrom-Andrews, and Peter Dale.

Warner Music released the film's soundtrack in the UK, while Edward Noeltner's Cinema Management Group handled international sales. The film received its world première at the Sci-Fi-London film festival on 4 May 2008.

According to Rockerparis, Iron Maiden lead singer Bruce Dickinson was in Paris on 26 November to promote the film's DVD release. The screening and press conference were held in a private cinema in front of Europe 1 radio near the Champs Elysées. Dickinson, who has a small cameo role in the film, has stated, "On several levels, I think it will be nice for them ([Iron Maiden fans]) to see somebody from Maiden doing something else that gets the band's name out there and also potentially gets a bit of respect for heavy metal and all the rest of it....But, in addition, I think they'll just enjoy it. It's a rollicking good story."

Reception

Horror.com praised the film, calling it "a mixed bag of tricks to be sure, but it's worth a look for the curio factor. (At least it's not a remake, a J-horror knock-off, or torture porn.)"

Soundtrack
Track listing:
 "Chemical Wedding" – Bruce Dickinson
 "Hush Hush Here Comes the Bogie Man" – Henry Hall / Val Rosing
 "Fanlight Fanny" – George Formby
 "Man of Sorrows" – Bruce Dickinson
 "The Wicker Man" – Iron Maiden
 "Can I Play with Madness" – Iron Maiden
 "Separation" – Skin
 "Prélude à l'après-midi d'un faune" – Debussy
 "The Hallelujah Chorus" – Handel
 (Excerpt) "Violin Concerto" – Mozart

References

External links
Official site

2008 horror films
Iron Maiden (band)
2000s science fiction horror films
British supernatural horror films
British science fiction horror films
Cultural depictions of Aleister Crowley
2008 films
2000s English-language films
2000s British films